Catrin Stewart (born 29 January 1988) is a Welsh actress best known for playing Jenny Flint in the BBC science fiction series Doctor Who (2011–2014), Emma Morris in the Sky One comedy drama Stella (2012–2017) and PC Gina Jenkins in the S4C crime drama Bang (2017–2020). She also portrayed Lily in Misfits (2010–2011).

Early life and education 
Stewart grew up in Wales and attended the Welsh-language secondary school Ysgol Gyfun Gymraeg Plasmawr in Cardiff. From a young age, she performed at the annual eisteddfod, a competitive festival of the arts between schools. Her mother used to tell her that she was "the one in the school concert she could hear out of everyone" as she was so passionate about acting. She went to drama classes from the age of 10 to 15, where she was mainly trained for television. At the age of 16, she joined the National Youth Theatre of Wales and went on to study at the Royal Welsh College of Music & Drama. Before graduating, Stewart had already appeared in the  BBC One medical drama Casualty (2007), as well as the films Hearts of Gold (2003) and Crusade in Jeans (2006).

Career 
In 2011, she joined the main cast of the Sky One comedy series Stella (2012–2017), portraying Emma Morris, the "sweet, loving and funny" daughter of Ruth Jones' titular character.

In 2012, Stewart took on the leading role of Juliet in Headlong's production of Romeo and Juliet. Kate Kellaway of The Observer called her performance "one of the most captivating and touching [she has] seen." The following year, she made her London theatre debut in Longing at the Hampstead Theatre, playing opposite Tamsin Greig and Iain Glen.

The film won the Best Performance in a British Feature Film award at the Edinburgh International Film Festival, becoming the first Welsh-language film to do so. Stewart was also nominated for the Seymour Cassel Award for Outstanding Performance at the Oldenburg International Film Festival.

Filmography

Film

Television

Stage

Web

Audio and radio dramas

Audiobook narration 

 Clara and the Maze of Cui Palta (2018) by Susan Calman
 The Promise (2021) by Lucy Diamond
 The Crimson Horror (2021) by Mark Gatiss

Accolades

Awards 

 HorrorHound Film Festival – Best Actress for Connie (2016)

Nominations 

 GenreBlast Film Festival Award – Best Actress (Short Film) for Connie (2016)
 Unrestricted View Film Festival – Best Actress (Short) for Connie (2016)

References

External links
 
 Catrin Stewart at British Comedy Guide

1988 births
Living people
Welsh television actresses
Welsh film actresses
Welsh stage actresses
Alumni of the Royal Welsh College of Music & Drama
21st-century Welsh actresses